Iran participated in the 1974 Asian Games as a host, and was ranked 2nd with 36 gold medals at this Asiad.

Competitors

Medal summary

Medal table

Medalists

Results by event

Aquatics

Diving

Swimming

Water polo

Men

Athletics

Badminton

Men

Women

Mixed

Basketball

Men

Women

Boxing

Men

Cycling

Road

Men

Track

Fencing

Field hockey

Football

Men

Gymnastics

Shooting

Table tennis

Tennis

Volleyball

Weightlifting

Men

Wrestling

Men's freestyle

Men's Greco-Roman

References

External links
  Iran Olympic Committee - Asian Games Medalists
  Iran National Sports Organization - Asian Games Medalists

Nations at the 1974 Asian Games
1974
Asian Games